Davud Mammadsoy (born 4 November 1995) is an Azerbaijani judoka.

He is the gold medallist of the 2021 Judo Grand Slam Tel Aviv in the -60 kg category.

References

External links
 

1995 births
Living people
Azerbaijani male judoka
20th-century Azerbaijani people
21st-century Azerbaijani people